Poshteh-ye Kamal (also Romanized as Poshteh-ye Kamāl; also known as Posht Kamāl) is a village in Poshtkuh Rural District, in the Central District of Khash County, Sistan and Baluchestan Province, Iran. At the 2006 census, its population was 328, in 56 families.

References 

Populated places in Khash County